is an autobahn in Germany that is in the planning stage. The A 22 is supposed to connect the A 28 near Westerstede with the A 27 near Bremerhaven, crossing the A 29 near Jaderberg . A vital part of the projected A 22 is the Wesertunnel south of Bremerhaven, which is currently part of Bundesstraße 437. Eastwards of Bremerhaven, the A 22 planning proposes passing Stade and crossing the Elbe river as part of the A 20.
Details of the trajectory are being discussed in the counties and municipalities involved; the projected start of construction is said to be around 2013.

On 25 June 2010 the land counsel of Lower Saxony decided that the A22 will be renamed to A20 to show it is a lengthening of the Ostsee- or Küstenautobahn.

Proposed Route 

 Küstenautobahn-Infos 

22
A022
Proposed roads in Germany